The 2014 Heilbronner Neckarcup was a professional tennis tournament played on clay courts. It was the first edition of the tournament which was part of the 2014 ATP Challenger Tour. It took place in Heilbronner, Germany between 12 and 18 May 2014.

Singles main-draw entrants

Seeds

 1 Rankings are as of May 5, 2014.

Other entrants
The following players received wildcards into the singles main draw:
  Nils Langer
  Kyle Edmund
  Björn Phau
  Alexander Zverev

The following player used protected ranking to gain entry into the singles main draw:
  Giovanni Lapentti

The following players received entry from the qualifying draw:
  André Ghem
  Jason Kubler
  Thanasi Kokkinakis
  Kimmer Coppejans

Doubles main-draw entrants

Seeds

 1 Rankings are as of May 5, 2014.

Other entrants
The following pairs received wildcards into the doubles main draw:
  André Ghem /  Sander Groen
  Kevin Krawietz /  Frank Moser
  Thanasi Kokkinakis /  Alexander Zverev

Champions

Singles

 Jan-Lennard Struff def.  Márton Fucsovics, 6–2, 7–6(7–5)

Doubles

 Andre Begemann /  Tim Puetz def.  Jesse Huta Galung /  Rameez Junaid, 6–3, 6–3

External links
Official Website

Heilbronner Neckarcup
Heilbronner Neckarcup
May 2014 sports events in Europe
2014 in German tennis